Partridge Township is located in Woodford County, Illinois. As of the 2010 census, its population was 593 and it contained 243 housing units.

Geography

Demographics

References

External links
City-data.com
Illinois State Archives

Townships in Woodford County, Illinois
Peoria metropolitan area, Illinois
Townships in Illinois